"Crazy Beat" is a song by English band Blur. It was released as the second single from their seventh album Think Tank in 2003. "Crazy Beat" has been compared by critics and the band to Blur's 1997 hit "Song 2" in its guitar-driven simplicity. Released in the United States as the first single from the album, it became Blur's first single since "Song 2" to chart on the Modern Rock Tracks chart, reaching No. 22. Graham Coxon, who had left the group prior to the album's release, plays on the single's B-side "The Outsider".

Video
"Crazy Beat" was supported by two music videos. The official video sees the band performing the song and creating a beast composed of green lightning which attacks people in a pub (Graham Coxon does not appear in this video). The alternate video shows four women performing a peculiar dance to the song, wearing matching brown dresses and blonde wigs while the band is playing in the background.

Cover art

The single's cover art features a satirical portrait of the British Royal Family by the English graffiti artist Banksy. The mural was painted on a building in Stoke Newington. In September 2009, workers sent by Hackney London Borough Council painted over most of the mural with black paint, against the building owner's wishes.

Track listings
7"
"Crazy Beat"
"The Outsider"

CD
"Crazy Beat"
"Don't Be"
"Crazy Beat" (alternative video)

DVD
"Crazy Beat" (video)
"Don't Be"
"The Outsider"
"Crazy Beat" (animatic)

CD (Canadian version)
"Crazy Beat"
"Tune Two"

Production credits
"Crazy Beat" produced by Norman Cook, Blur and Ben Hillier
"Don't Be" and "The Outsider" produced by Blur and Ben Hillier
Damon Albarn - vocals, guitars, programming
Alex James: bass, backing vocals
Dave Rowntree - drums, programming
Fatboy Slim - keyboards, synths, programming, effects

Charts

Weekly positions

References

Songs written by Damon Albarn
Blur (band) songs
2003 singles
Songs written by Alex James (musician)
Songs written by Dave Rowntree
Parlophone singles
Food Records singles
2003 songs